Karaski may refer to several places in Estonia:
Karaski, Põlva County, village in Estonia
Karaski, Võru County, village in Estonia